Pence is an unincorporated community in Scott County, Kansas, United States.

History
The community of Pence was platted on 1886 October 27. A post office was opened in Pence in 1887, and remained in operation until it was discontinued in 1920.

References

Further reading

External links
 Scott County maps: Current, Historic, KDOT

Unincorporated communities in Scott County, Kansas
Unincorporated communities in Kansas